The Ubari Desert, Idehan Ubari, Idehan Awbari (Idehan means fine sand in Tamasheq) or Ubari Erg is an erg in the hyper-arid Fezzan region of southwestern Libya with a surface of approximately 58,000 km². The area of the Ubari desert has been traditionally inhabited by Tuareg people.

Geography

The Idehan Ubari is named after the town of Ubari or Awbari, a Berber-speaking oasis town and the capital of the Wadi al Hayaa District in the area. Like the Idehan Marzuq further south, the Idehan Ubari is part of the greater Sahara Desert.

The Mandara Lakes are located in Gaberoun, an oasis in the eastern zone of the Ubari Desert.

See also
Geography of Libya
List of ergs

References

External links
Al-Arabiya - Limited production resumes at South Libya oilfield

Deserts of Libya
Fezzan
Ergs of Africa
Sahara